The Bank of America Center is a commercial high-rise building in Tulsa, Oklahoma. The building rises 412 feet (126 m) in downtown Tulsa. and contains  of space. It has 32 floors, and was completed in 1967 as the Fourth National Bank of Tulsa. It is located on the corner of Sixth Street and Boulder Avenue, the site of the former Tulsa County court house. The Bank of America Center currently stands as the 5th-tallest building in the city, and the 9th-tallest building in the state of Oklahoma. The architectural firm who designed the building was Kelley & Marshall of Tulsa. The Bank of America Center contains offices of the Charlotte-based Bank of America Corporation. It currently stands as the 2nd-tallest international style skyscraper in the city, behind the BOK Tower. It also houses the offices of several petroleum companies and the Oklahoma State Attorney General's office.

See also
 List of tallest buildings in Tulsa
List of tallest buildings in Oklahoma
 Buildings of Tulsa

References

Bank of America buildings
Skyscraper office buildings in Tulsa, Oklahoma

Office buildings completed in 1967